"South of the Border" is a song by English singer-songwriter Ed Sheeran featuring Cuban-American singer Camila Cabello and Dominican-American rapper Cardi B. It was released on 12 July 2019 through Asylum and Atlantic Records, along with "Antisocial", as the sixth and seventh singles respectively from Sheeran's compilation album, No.6 Collaborations Project (2019).

The song was written by the artists alongside Pardison Fontaine, Steve Mac, and Fred Again, with the latter two producing it with Sheeran. It reached the top ten in eight countries and is certified Gold or higher in eleven countries.

Background
Sheeran's manager replied to fan's tweet that it would be his next single. A few days later Sheeran posted a picture of his manager replied on Instagram story. On 28 September, Cabello posted a poster for the music video.

Composition 
Musically, "South of the Border" is a three minutes and twenty-four seconds Latin pop song. In terms of music notation, "South of the Border" was composed using  common time in the key of D minor, with a tempo of 98 beats per minute. Sheeran, Cabello and Cardi B's vocals range from the low note F3 to the high note of G5.

Music video
On July 12, 2019, the lyric video for "South of the Border" was released on Sheeran's YouTube channel, while a music video for the song was released on October 4, also on Sheeran's YouTube channel. In the video, Sheeran plays Teddy Fingers, Cabello plays Mariposa, and Cardi B appears as herself alongside actress Alexis Ren as Scarlet Jones and actor Paul Karmiryan as Agent X. As of April 2020, it has received over 100 million views.

Commercial performance
In the United Kingdom, the song debuted at No. 40 on UK Singles Chart. It later climbed the chart and reached its peak at No. 4 on the chart issue dated 25 October 2019, becoming Sheeran's twenty sixth top 10, Cabello's fourth and Cardi B's fourth. It's also Cardi B's second highest-charting song in the UK, after her number one single "WAP". On 10 January 2020, the song was certified platinum by BPI for surpassing sales of 600,000 units in the United Kingdom.

In the United States, the song debuted at No. 53 on the Billboard Hot 100 and No. 14 on Rolling Stone Top 100 when it became available for download and stream on the release of the album in the United States. It received 10.2 million streams in the first week it was available to streaming services, according to Rolling Stone. Following its release as a single, the track re-entered the Hot 100 at No. 100. It has since risen to a new peak of No. 49 there, while reaching a high position of No. 16 on the Mainstream Top 40 chart. It also reached No. 16 on the Billboard Digital Song Sales chart. On 9 December 2019, the song was certified gold by the RIAA for surpassing sales of 500,000 units in the United States.

The song also debuted in the top 15 on official charts in Australia, Canada, New Zealand, Singapore, Slovakia and Sweden.

Credits and personnel
Credits adapted from the liner notes of No.6 Collaborations Project.

Publishing
 Published by Ed Sheeran Limited and Sony/ATV Music Publishing (UK) Limited, Rokstone Music Limited administered under exclusive license to Universal Music Publishing Limited, Promised Land Music Ltd. / Universal Music Publishing Ltd., Milamoon Songs BMI published by Syco admin. by Sony ATV, Washpoppin Inc/Sony ATV Tunes LLC (ASCAP) and Sony/ATV Songs LLC (BMI). Used by permission. All rights reserved. 
 Camila Cabello appears courtesy of Syco / Epic Records, a division of Sony Music Entertainment
 Cardi B appears courtesy of KSR / Atlantic Recording Corporation

Recording
 Mixed at Mixstar Studios, Virginia Beach, Virginia
 Recorded at Rokstone Studios, London; Henson Studios, Los Angeles, California; Glenwood Recording Studios, Burbank, California; and Promised Land Music Studios, London

Personnel

Ed Sheeran – vocals, songwriter, producer, guitar
Camila Cabello – featured vocals, songwriter
Cardi B – featured vocals, songwriter
Fred Gibson – songwriter, producer, bass, drums, keyboards
 Steve Mac – songwriter, producer, keyboards, synthesizer
Pardison Fontaine – songwriter
 Evan LaRay – engineer
 John Hanes – engineer
 Simone Torres – engineer
 Stuart Hawkes – mastering
 Serban Ghenea – mixing
 Chris Laws – programming

Track listing

Charts

Original version

Weekly charts

Year-end charts

Cheat Codes remix

Certifications

Release history

References

2019 singles
2019 songs
Ed Sheeran songs
Camila Cabello songs
Cardi B songs
Song recordings produced by Ed Sheeran
Songs written by Cardi B
Songs written by Camila Cabello
Songs written by Ed Sheeran
Songs written by Fred Again
Songs written by Pardison Fontaine
Songs written by Steve Mac